David Healy may refer to:

David Healy (actor) (1929–1995), American-born, also appeared in many British films and TV shows
David Healy (astronomer) (1936–2011), American astrophotographer and asteroid discoverer
David Healy (footballer) (born 1979), Northern Irish footballer
David Healy (psychiatrist) (born 1954), Irish psychiatrist
David Healy, a fictional character in the TV series Roseanne